Ignorance Is Bliss is a 2017 Italian comedy film directed by Massimiliano Bruno. The film received mixed reviews from critics.

Cast

References

External links

2017 films
2010s Italian-language films
2017 comedy films
Italian comedy films
Films directed by Massimiliano Bruno
Films produced by Fulvio Lucisano
2010s Italian films